Mabey is a surname. Notable people with the surname include:

Bevil Mabey (1916-2010), English businessman and inventor
Caroline Mabey (21st century), alternative comedian
Charles R. Mabey (1877–1959), American politician
Paul Mabey (c. 1786 – 1863), merchant and political figure in Prince Edward Island
Reginald W. Mabey (1932–?), Canadian politician
Richard Mabey (born 1941), British naturalist and author